"Down with the Sickness" is a song by American heavy metal band Disturbed. It was recorded in 1999 and released as the second single from the band's debut studio album, The Sickness. "Down with the Sickness" is one of Disturbed's best-known songs and is a concert staple, usually played as the last song. This was Disturbed's first single to be certified platinum in the United States by the Recording Industry Association of America.

Music and composition
"Down With the Sickness" is a nu metal song that features an unusual "ooh-wah-ah-ah-ah" staccato noise from Disturbed's singer David Draiman at the end of the intro, which reappears before the last chorus.
Draiman has stated the sound was made possible by effects on his vocal cords after receiving surgery for acid reflux, but he has dismissed the rumor the noise was actually caused by heartburn, further explaining, "I mean the song originally was written and just had a pause. Mikey's beat is just so tribal and you know it just made me feel like an animal... [The noise] came out one day."

Guitarist Dan Donegan has mentioned that the tuning for the guitar "is drop C-sharp... your bottom five strings are half a step down and your low string will be dropped to C-sharp." This is sometimes referred to as "E Drop D", the most common drop tuning for bands who play generally in E standard instead of E standard.

Lyrics
A spoken segment near the end of the song describes a child who is physically abused by his mother and who ultimately retaliates. This segment is somewhat controversial and music critics sometimes express a negative opinion of its inclusion in the song. For example, Leor Galil of the Chicago Reader opined, "Yet I still find it hard to believe that the megasingle 'Down With the Sickness,' with its vocal breakdown in which front man David Draiman crudely describes being beaten by his mom (and vice versa), guided the band on to a path that's resulted in four albums topping the Billboard 200."

However, the band has disavowed that this song is about literal child abuse, and that it is instead about a metaphoric abuse. Lead singer David Draiman explained to the Phoenix New Times:
...the screamed psychodramas in metal hits like "Down With The Sickness" ... are merely inspired by personal history, not a literal journal of his own tortured upbringing. "I'm really talking about the conflict between the mother culture of society, who's beating down the child yearning for independence and individuality, and the submission of the child."

The "abuse" segment is not included in the radio edit or the music video.

Music video
A music video composed of live concert footage was produced for the song. The song is known for its segment which features a boy being attacked and abused by his mother, which was not featured in the music video. The music video was recorded at the "Hollywood Casino Amphitheatre" (at the time the Tweeter Center) in Tinley Park, Illinois during Q101's Jamboree 2001.

In other media
Films
 The song is played during the end credits of the 2004 remake of Dawn of the Dead
 The Death of Dick Long
 Green Street
 Queen of the Damned
 The One

TV shows
 The intro is included in the Brooklyn Nine-Nine episode "Sicko"
 South Park episode "With Apologies to Jesse Jackson"

Video games
 The song is used as one of the menu soundtracks of WWE 2K18
 Guitar Hero 5
 Guitar Hero Live
 Rock Band 2

Other
 Professional wrestler Christopher Chri$ Ca$h Bauman used "Down with the Sickness" as his theme song from 2001 - 2005 in CZW

Accolades

Personnel
 David Draiman – vocals
 Dan Donegan – guitar, electronics
 Steve Kmak – bass guitar
 Mike Wengren – drums, percussion, programmer
 Johnny K – producer, engineer
 Andy Wallace – mixer
 Howie Weinberg – mastering

Charts

Certifications

References

External links
  

2000 singles
1999 songs
Disturbed (band) songs
Giant Records (Warner) singles
Songs written by Dan Donegan
Songs written by David Draiman
Songs written by Mike Wengren
Song recordings produced by Johnny K